Daniel Keith "Dandrew" Stevens (born October 19, 1978 in New Jersey) is an American musician and songwriter.

Stevens is the current bassist in the punk rock group The Dead Milkmen, replacing the deceased Dave Schulthise for Dead Milkmen reunion performances in 2004 and officially joining the band during their 2008 reformation. Stevens has also played in several Philadelphia-area bands, including The Low Budgets (with Dead Milkmen bandmate Joe Genaro), Farquar Muckenfuss, The Uptown Welcomes, and V.A.K.E.P.O.R.

Stevens is frequently referred to by the nickname "Dandrew".  He is the father of three children.

References

External links
Official Dead Milkmen site
Official Low Budgets site

American punk rock bass guitarists
Living people
1978 births
The Dead Milkmen members
American male bass guitarists
21st-century American bass guitarists
21st-century American male musicians